Steve, Steven or Stephen Heller may refer to:

Steve Heller (fiction), American author of The Automotive History of Lucky Kellerman
Steven Heller (composer-producer), American producer-composer who has won two Grammy Awards
Steven Heller (design writer) (born 1950), American art director, journalist, critic, author, and editor on graphic design
Stephen Heller (1813–1888), Hungarian pianist and composer
Stephen Heller (whistleblower), whistleblower on illegal and uncertified Californian voting machines at Diebold Election Systems